Immanuel Bible Church is a non-denominational church located in Springfield, Virginia.

History
The church was founded in 1964 as a Baptist church (part of the General Association of Regular Baptists).  The groundbreaking for the church's building took place in 1966.  In 1984 the church became non-denominational.

Immanuel Christian School 

The school has been criticized for their anti-LGBT policies, which ban LGBTQ students and employees. This followed the decision of Karen Pence, second lady, to return as an art teacher in early 2019. The attention the school received as a result of this caused a media debate as to whether their policies are discriminatory. A result of this controversy is the decision of The Sheridan School to refuse to play division basketball games with ICS.

References

External links
 Official website

Evangelical megachurches in the United States
Megachurches in Virginia
Evangelical churches in Virginia
Christian organizations established in 1964
20th-century Protestant churches
1964 establishments in Virginia